Joshua Reagan (born November 5, 1989) is an American pair skater. Competing for Canada with Brittany Jones, he is the 2016 U.S. International Classic champion. Earlier in his career, he represented the United States with Ashley Cain. They became the 2011 U.S. Junior champions and placed fourth at the 2011 World Junior Championships.

Personal life 
His father is an ophthalmologist who lives in Dallas, Texas. Josh currently lives in Toronto, Ontario. Reagan and Jones retired from skating in July 2017.

Career 
Reagan began skating in 1998 at Americas Ice Garden in downtown Dallas. On August 1, 2005, he sustained a concussion in an on-ice fall and became blind in one eye for a year. He focused on swimming for the next four years but then returned to skating.

Reagan began skating with Ashley Cain in April 2009. They were coached by David Kirby (son of Michael Kirby) and Peter Cain at the Dr. Pepper Star Center in Euless, Texas. Cain and Reagan finished 4th at the 2011 World Junior Championships and won the 2011 U.S. Junior title. On February 24, 2012, they announced the end of their partnership.

On March 22, 2012, it was announced that Reagan had teamed up with 2011 U.S. senior champion Caitlin Yankowskas. They were coached by Johnny Johns, David Kirby, and Marina Zueva in Canton, Michigan. Yankowskas and Reagan were assigned to the 2012 Cup of China and the 2012 NHK Trophy but withdrew from both events after Reagan sustained a rib injury in practice. They ended their partnership without having competing anywhere. On April 29, 2013, Reagan and Becky Bereswill announced they had formed a partnership. They too parted ways without appearing in a competition.

In October 2013, Reagan was paired with Canadian skater Brittany Jones by Kristy Wirtz and Kris Wirtz, who coached the pair in Kitchener-Waterloo, Ontario. Jones/Reagan decided to compete for Canada and placed seventh at the 2014 Canadian Championships. They changed coaches in spring 2015, moving to Bryce Davison.

Jones/Reagan won gold at the 2016 U.S. International Classic after placing second in the short and first in the free.

Programs

With Jones

With Yankowskas

With Cain

Competitive highlights 
GP: Grand Prix; CS: Challenger Series; JGP: Junior Grand Prix

With Jones for Canada

With Yankowskas for the United States

With Cain for the United States

References

External links 

 
 
 

American male pair skaters
1989 births
Living people
People from DeSoto, Texas
Sportspeople from the Dallas–Fort Worth metroplex
American emigrants to Canada